Luju or Lu Ju may refer to:

Lu opera (庐剧), a Chinese opera form from central Anhui
Lü opera (吕剧), a Chinese opera form from southwestern Shandong
Luju, Yunnan (路居), a town in Yuxi, Yunnan, China
Lü Ju (呂據) (died 256), Eastern Wu general